Zavidovo is a village (selo) in Konakovsky District of Tver Oblast, Russia. It is used as an official residence place for the President of Russia.

During the Soviet era it was described as the "Politburo hunting preserve" and the "Soviet equivalent of Camp David". Henry Kissinger visited in May 1973 and was informed that it was a great honour to be invited there, being only the third foreigner (after President Tito of Yugoslavia and President Urho Kekkonen of Finland) to be invited.

Country retreats of the President of Russia
Novo-Ogaryovo
Bocharov Ruchey

References

External links
Official Site

Rural localities in Konakovsky District
Official residences in Russia
Populated places established in 1560
Klinsky Uyezd